Podgrađe is a village in Zagorje, Croatia.

References

Populated places in Krapina-Zagorje County